= Hans Frei (luthier) =

German renaissance luthier (1450 - 1523)

Hans Frei or Hans Frey (1450–1523) was a renaissance luthier specialising in lutes, from Nuremberg, Germany. He worked in Bologna, Italy. His instruments survive at the Kunsthistorisches Museum, Vienna, Austria.
